Husband selling was the historical practice of: a wife selling a husband, generally to a new wife; a slave-master or master's estate selling the husband in an enslaved family, generally to a new slave-master;  court-sentenced sales of fathers' services for a number of years, described as sales of fathers (one apparently a husband); sales of a husband as directed by a religious authority.


Sales by wives 
Intermaritally, no more than five or six cases of husbands having been sold by their wives are known in English and English diasporan history, in comparison to approximately 400 reportable cases of wives having been sold by their husbands in the English custom. The known sales of husbands by wives occurred in the 19th century.

In the intermarital context, the practice was somewhat but not entirely parallel to wife selling in the same nation. On the one hand, in both practices, the person was sold by the current spouse to a new spouse, the sale causing a divorce with the seller and creating a new marriage with the buyer. Sales were sometimes by means of a contract but never ritualistically, as far as is known. It is possible that the law, and the response of courts to cases, was the same regardless of gender.

In the Republic of Vietnam (South Vietnam), Tuân Sắc in 1969 "argued,  are ... even women who sell their husbands for a little spending money (it's all in the newspapers) and posited that such people are not, or are no longer, Vietnamese.

Sales by slave-masters and their estates 

In the slave-mastery context, in Philadelphia, in ca. the 18th century, sales often occurred not only by or at the direction of living slave-masters but also at the direction of testators. Testators were not known to direct that slave couples be kept together. "Philadelphia newspaper advertisements ... provide evidence that many [slave] owners sold husbands away from wives ...; most indicated no concern about the consequences for the slaves." Some sales of slave husbands without their wives were followed by the masters requiring the wives to take new husbands.

A woman slave, according to Daniel Meaders, "married [a slave] ..., but soon after the marriage, the 'husband was sold and sent away. I never saw him afterwards..

In Virginia, in 1772–1773, a Baptist church considered a complaint against an individual that the selling of a slave husband, causing separation from his wife, was un-Christian, a matter which the county judiciary would not decide.

One case in Massachusetts was alleged in 1799 against a political candidate but denied by the candidate.

In Haiti, when it was St. Domingue, a law of 1685 on slavery forbade "selling a [slave] husband or wife separately."

In Colombia under Spanish colonial rule, particularly in 1750–1826, according to David L. Chandler, Spanish law "allowed slaves to marry and establish a family even against the master's wishes ... and prohibited ... [the family's] separation through sale....  of the slave family was not very common." If a slave couple was broken up by the sale of one spouse out of an area, Chandler wrote, the other spouse, even after 10 years, could petition a court to allow the latter slave to find a buyer so the couple could reunite; such cases, in which the wife was sold first and the husband second, were litigated in 1802 and 1806. In 1808, reported Chandler, a master had sold a slave husband to another master; the slave objected to a breakup of his family and a court ordered visitations; after a subsequent dispute between the slaves and the selling master, the master who sold the husband "brought suit against the new owner ... to force her either to sell him out of the area or to sell him back to ... [the first master] so he could properly discipline and control" the slave-husband but was ordered by a court to sell the slave's wife to the other master as well, so the slave family would be able to live together and not merely have visits; and the court order was complied with.

Sales for child support defaults 
Fathers were sometimes sold, and in some cases sales of the fathers' full-time services for terms of years were described as sales of fathers; one said he was a husband and the result of his case did not necessarily require disputing that. According to Richard B. Morris, "in prosecuting for bastardy it was customary throughout ... [South Carolina] to sell into servitude for a period of four years the putative father upon his defaulting on ... maintenance of the ... child". Morris described the "appropriation of the white worker's time" due to the sale as "complete". The maximum term was four years and less was sometimes imposed, but, according to Morris, one court sentenced one man to a sale for 10 years. These fathers were, according to Morris, "indiscreet poor whites". One defendant stated that he was a husband and that someone else caused the out-of-wedlock birth, but he was convicted anyway. These sales were authorized by a statute enacted in 1839 and repealed in 1847, replaced by handling as misdemeanors.

Sales at religious direction 
Hatred of a wife was a ground for forcing a sale of the husband into slavery. In the medieval Christian Church, according to Frederik Pijper in 1909, "if anyone abandoned his wife, and refusing to come to terms with her, permitted himself to be put into prison for debtors, he became a slave forever on the ground of his hatred for his wife. And should he be seen at any time enjoying liberty, he must again be sold."

In the same Church, according to Pijper, "one way [to "become a slave"] was by selling oneself because of poverty. It might so happen that a married pair sank into such need that the husband was compelled to sell himself, and did so with his wife's consent. In this way he secured sustenance for himself, and with the purchase-money he was in a position to keep his wife from starving.... A synod at Paris early in the seventh century ordained that freemen who had sold ... themselves should if they repaid the money at once be restored to their former status. To demand back a greater sum than what had been paid for them, was not allowed."

A church decision at Vermeria in the 8th century, according to Pijper, specified that if a slave husband was sold both spouses should be discouraged from remarrying; "if through sale a slave be separated from his wife, also a slave, each should be urged to remain thus (i. e., not to marry again) in case we cannot reunite them."

If a married slave's freedom was not bought, i.e., the married slave was not sold into freedom, the slave's already-freed spouse could remarry, under permission of the medieval Church, if the former couple had been wed by one master; according to Pijper, "if ... two slaves were joined in wedlock by their common master, and one of them was thereafter freed, that one was permitted to marry again, if the freedom of the other could not be bought."

Popular culture 
In popular culture, a wife's sale of her husband to a widow is depicted in 1960 in a play by François Billetdoux, Le Comportement des époux Bredburry (sic), and the playwright claimed to have seen such an advertisement in "an American paper". Indigenous Sufi folk-poetry told of "the foolish queen Lila who, for the sake of a fabulous necklace, 'sold' her husband to her maid for a night", thereby requiring purification for the Queen.

See also 

 Child-selling
 Human trafficking
 Wife selling, for a worldwide overview

Notes

References 

Divorce
Marriage law
Child support
Men's rights
Slavery
English culture
Social history of England
19th century in England
Marriage, unions and partnerships in England
African-American history in Philadelphia
1770s in Virginia
1790s in Massachusetts
History of Haiti
History of Colombia
Law of Colombia
Legal history of South Carolina
19th century in South Carolina
Sufi poetry